In Excelsis (Latin "on high") may refer to:

In Excelsis, EP from Killing Joke discography
"In Excelsis", by The Childrens Choir of Elbosco from Angelis (Hispavox, 1995)
"In Excelsis", by Azealia Banks from Fantasea II: The Second Wave 2018

See also
Gloria in excelsis Deo, Christian hymn
In Excelsis Deo, episode of the first season of The West Wing
Regnans in Excelsis